List of extraterrestrial memorials is a list of different types of memorials that are not on Earth.

Mars

Several landing sites have been named, either the spacecraft itself or the landing site:
 Pennants of Soviet Union on Mars 2 and Mars 3 landers (1971).
 Thomas Mutch Memorial Station, the Viking 1 lander (1976). 
 Gerald Soffen Memorial Station, the Viking 2 lander (1976).
 Carl Sagan Memorial Station, Mars Pathfinder (Sojourner) base (1997).
 Challenger Memorial Station, MER-B (Opportunity) landing site area (2004).
 Columbia Memorial Station, MER-A (Spirit) landing site area (2004).
 Green Valley, the Phoenix lander (2008).
 Phoenix DVD
 Bradbury Landing, Curiosity rover landing site (August 6, 2012). (Note: No actual hardware at location.)
Rafael Navarro Mountain (Curiosity rover; April 5, 2021) 
The Mars Curiosity Lincoln penny
 InSight Landing, the InSight lander (2018).
 Octavia E. Butler Landing, Perseverance rover landing site (2021).
 Perseverance rover Tribute to healthcare workers plate and Martian Meteorite
 "Send Your Name to Mars" on the Perseverance rover and Human DNA and Mars family inscriptions
 The Ingenuity helicopter carries a small piece of fabric from the wing of the first powered aircraft, the 1903 Wright Flyer built and flown by the Wright Brothers, and its take-off and landing area has been named Wright Brothers Field.
 Perseverances parachute with coded message "Dare mighty things"

Earth
Plaque designed by Carl Sagan on LAGEOS-1
Immortality Drive, in the International Space Station
A GeoSat time capsule aboard EchoStar XVI, The Last Pictures (includes 100 black and white photographs) 
Apollo 15 postal covers on the International Space Station
3 Lego Astronauts of Expedition 42: Terry Virts, Anton Shkaplerov and Samantha Cristoforetti
The LEO library by the Arch Mission Foundation

The Moon
Fallen Astronaut, is a lunar plaque and small memorial statue for lives lost in space exploration. It was placed on the Moon during the 1971 Apollo 15 mission
Apollo 11, 12, 14, 15, 16, and 17 each left a plaque and flag at their landing sites.
Pennants of the Soviet Union on Luna 2 impactor
Flag of India on ISRO's Moon Impact Probe that was released by Chandrayaan-1 and impacted the Lunar surface on 14 November 2008.
Moon Museum was left on the leg of the lunar module on Apollo 12. It had artwork from Andy Warhol, Robert Rauschenberg, David Novros, Forrest Myers, Claes Oldenburg and John Chamberlain
Luna 01 from Celestis
 Arch Mission Foundation's Lunar Library, possibly surviving after the Beresheet Moon lander's crash landing.
The flag of China on Chang'e 5
Manfred Memorial Moon Mission (lunar flyby and Earth orbit, memorial to Manfred Fuchs)

Planned

Belgium2theMoon time capsule 
MoonArk, a lunar museum on the Peregrine lander. Made by Carnegie Mellon University
Memory of Mankind on the Moon, Team Puli from Hungary plans to send a time capsule for the "Memory of Mankind (MoM) on the Moon" project. The capsule will hold ceramic tablets containing archival imagery and texts readable with a 10x magnifier. 
DHL Moonbox is a mementos box planned to go to the Moon on the Peregrine lander in 2022. It is made by DHL and Airbus Defence and Space
All the payloads on DHL MoonBox
Lunar Libraries by the Arch Mission Foundation
Lunar Dream Time Capsule, from Astroscale
Lunaprise A time capsule on the Nova-C lunar lander
Luna 03
Lunar Codex's Peregrine Collection - books and art on memory cards on the Peregrine lunar lander in 2022
Lunar Codex's Nova Collection - art and poetry on nanofice on the Nova-C lunar lander in 2022
Lunar Codex's Polaris Collection - art, books, poetry, music and film on hybrid memory cards and nanofiche on the Griffin lunar lander in 2023/24

Titan
 Hubert Curien Memorial Station, Huygens landing site on Saturn's moon.

Jupiter
Junos three LEGO figurines
Galileo Galilei plaque on Juno

Other
Two Voyager Golden Records, on board the Voyager spacecraft
Arch Mission disk 1.2 on the Tesla Roadster in solar orbit.
Rosetta disk prototype, on the Rosetta space probe
New Horizons Memorabilia
The Pioneer plaques, individual plaques on Pioneer 10 and Pioneer 11

Proposed
KEO

References

External links

Spaceflight
Space lists

Extraterrestrial memorials